BRP Andrés Bonifacio (PS-17) is the third ship of the Gregorio del Pilar-class offshore patrol vessels of the Philippine Navy. She is the second ship of the Philippine Navy to be named after Andrés Bonifacio, a Filipino revolutionary leader, regarded as the "Father of the Philippine Revolution" and one of the most influential national heroes of the Philippines.

She was originally designated upon commissioning as "FF-17". In February 2019, the Navy downgraded the status of the entire class from frigate to patrol ship and redesignated her to "PS-17".

Design
The ship was designed with a high level of habitability and provides fairly comfortable accommodations, including air conditioning.

Propulsion
The Andres Bonifacio employs the shipboard application of aircraft gas turbine jet engines with the use of controllable pitch propellers. A retractable/rotatable bow propulsion unit provides manoeuvrability in tight situations.

Armament
Prior to turn-over to the Philippine Navy, the ship was armed with a Mk.75 Oto Melara 76mm/62cal Compact main gun, two Mk.38 25 mm Bushmaster chain guns at midships, and a Phalanx CIWS system aft. The CIWS and chain guns were removed prior to its turn-over, with the Mk.75 gun remaining.

Flight support
Andres Bonifacio has a flight deck and hangar capable of handling helicopters.

The Philippine Navy uses the AgustaWestland AW109E Power naval helicopter as its standard helicopter for the entire class.

Modernization

The Philippine Navy plans to modernize the entire ship of the class, with an initial program to upgrade the ship's sensors, and another program to improve its weapon systems.

Several systems were acquired through US Foreign Military Sales (FMS) and Foreign Military Financing (FMF), which includes the BAE Systems Mk. 38 Mod. 2 machine gun system, the SAAB AN/SPS-77 Sea Giraffe AMB 3D air/surface search radar, and the FLIR Systems SeaFLIR 230 Electro-Optical/Infra-Red Camera.

Meanwhile, the Philippine Navy will launch a program to acquire, install and integrate several other sensors into the ship, as part of the Horizon 2 phase of the Revised AFP Modernization Program. Among those to be acquired are new Combat Management System (CMS), Hull Mounted Sonar (HMS), and a Radar Electronic Support Measures (R-ESM).

Future upgrades are planned to install defensive and offensive missile systems, as well as torpedo weapon system, although funding is still being secured and might only be included in the next phase of the Navy's modernization program.

In 2020 October 14, Navy chief Giovanni Carlo Bacordo revealed the completion of the 3D modeling program for the entire ship class' cabling systems to be used for their electronic upgrades (CMS + 4 sensors).

History

The U.S. decommissioned the cutter in early 2016 and the Philippines acquired it under the Excess Defense Articles and the Foreign Assistance Act.

The frigate was formally received by the Philippine Navy on July 21, 2016, and commissioned to service on the same day at the USCG base at Alameda, California. She arrived in Manila on December 9, 2016 after port visit in Guam on December 5, 2016.

Notable operational deployments

In April 2019, the BRP Andres Bonifacio had an unplanned encounter at sea with the frigate Wu Chang (FFG-1205) of the Taiwanese Navy near the Mavulis Island in Batanes. The two ships implemented the Naval Code for Unplanned Encounters at Sea (CUES) during the encounter. The Wu Chang was monitoring the activity at Mavulis while the BRP Bonifacio was on its way to South Korea.

Exercises
Langkawi International Maritime and Aerospace Exhibition (LIMA) 2017:
The BRP Andres Bonifacio was sent to Malaysia for its first international deployment as a Philippine Navy ship, to be the Philippines' representative in the LIMA 2017 from March 21 to 26, 2017. The ship also had a port call at the Lumut Naval Base in Perak, Malaysia and conducted joint exercises with the Royal Malaysian Navy, before docking at Port Klang, Selangor, Malaysia for a goodwill visit from March 30 to April 3, 2017.

Exercise Rim of the Pacific (RIMPAC) 2018:

From June to early August 2018, the ship participated in the RIMPAC 2018 together with the  Landing Platform Dock. This is the first time that the Philippine Navy sent ships to the world's largest International Maritime Exercise which is held biennially in Hawaii. Among the events the ship participated at RIMPAC were a one-day "Open Ship" Guided Ship Tour for the public where the Seabees Band had a Live-Band performance for the ship's visitors.

Balikatan 2019:
The ship participated on a Visit, board, search, and seizure operation during Balikatan 2019.

Gallery

See also
 List of ships of the Philippine Navy

References

External links 

Hamilton-class cutters of the Philippine Navy
Ships of the Philippine Navy
Ships built in Bridge City, Louisiana
1967 ships